The 2020–21 Vanderbilt Commodores women's basketball team represented Vanderbilt University during the 2020–21 NCAA Division I women's basketball season. The Commodores, led by fifth-year head coach Stephanie White, played their home games at Memorial Gymnasium and competed as members of the Southeastern Conference (SEC).

On January 18, 2021, it was announced that the team would end their season due to COVID-19 concerns, injuries, and a depleted roster. In March, following three student transfer requests, Vanderbilt fired White.

Roster

Preseason

SEC media poll
The SEC media poll was released on November 17, 2020.

Schedule

|-
!colspan=9 style=| Non-conference regular season

|-
!colspan=9 style=| SEC regular season

References

Vanderbilt Commodores women's basketball seasons
Vanderbilt
Vanderbilt Commodores women's
Vanderbilt Commodores women's
Vanderbilt